Francis Mountford, (1474/76–1536), of the Inner Temple, London and Feltwell, Norfolk, was an English Member of Parliament.

Francis owed much of his political career through his connections through his marriage to a member of the Thursby family.

Family 

He was the son of Osbert Mountford of Feltwell by Elizabeth, daughter of Francis Heath of Mildenhall, Suffolk.

Francis Mountford m. 1) Margaret, daughter of Thomas Thursby of Lynn, Norfolk; 2) Gertrude, daughter of Robert Hoting of London.

Francis had married Margaret Thursby before 11 August 1509, when Richard Aylmer's will is dated. He mentions 'my brother ffrannces mountford' in his will.

Children of Francis Mountford and Margaret Thursby, first marriage:

 Thomas (b.bef.1510), ob. s.p.
 Osbert Mondeford (b.bef.1510) of Feltwell or Fletwell, m. 1) Margaret, daughter of John Townsend, son of Sir Richard of Raynham; 2) Bridget, daughter of Sir John Spelman of Narborough in Norfolk
 Children of Osbert Mondeford and Margaret Townsend, first marriage:
 Elizabeth (d.1613), the wife of Geoffrey Cobb (d.1581) of Sandringham in Norfolk, the son of William Cobb and Dorothy, daughter of Sir John Spelman of Narborough, and had:
 Sir William Cobb (d. 27 August 1607) of Sandringham in Norfolk, Esq. son and heir, m. Mary (d.1629), granddaughter of Sir Henry Bedingfeld of Oxburgh, privy councillor to King Edward VI and Queen Mary I; knight of the shire for Norfolk; Constable of the Tower of London, Lieutenant of the Tower of London and captain of the guard and vice-chamberlain of the household of Mary I. Sir Henry Bedingfield was also the one entrusted with the care of Princess Elizabeth Tudor during the reign of Mary I after she had been suspected of involvement in Wyatt's Rebellion. She would forever afterwards refer to him affectionately as 'My Gaoler'. They had:
 Jeffrey Cobb (d. 14 July 1623), Esq., son and heir, m. Elizabeth, daughter and heiress of Anthony Thwaits of Hardingham, Esq. by Frances, the daughter and heiress of Humphrey Bedingfeld and Margaret, daughter of Edward Cocket of Ampton, and had:
 William Cobb (1613–1664+), son and heir, aged 10 years on the death of his father. He was a great royalist, and a colonel in the army, or militia, and suffered greatly on that account. He m. Elizabeth, daughter of Sir Henry Bedingfield of Oxburgh, and had by her four sons and several daughters.
 Jeffrey Cobb (b.1639), eldest son, was aged 25, in 1664, m. Frances, daughter of Isaac Astley of Melton Constable, Esq. He was the one who sold the lordship of Sandringham about 1686, to Sir Edward Atkyns, Chief Baron of the Exchequer.
 Children of Osbert Mondeford and Bridget Spilman, second marriage:
 Bridget, the wife of George Fowler
 Elizabeth, the wife of Thomas Mite (Might)
 Temperance, the wife of Francis Pratt of Ruston
 Ursula, the wife of John Fastolphe
 Alice, the wife of Edmond Cobb of Snetsham
 Francis Mondeford ob. s.p.
 Sir Edmond Moundeford of Mundford and Hockwold, Norfolk m. 1) Frances, daughter of Sir Thomas Gawdy of Claxton; 2) Abigail, daughter of Sir Thomas Knyvett of Ashwellthorpe
 Children of Sir Edmond Mondeford and Francis Gawdy, first marriage:
 Sir Edmund Moundeford (1596 – May 1643), who left much of his inheritance to his half-sister Elizabeth
 Elizabeth
 Children of Sir Edmond Mondeford and Abigail Knyvett, second marriage:
 Muriel
 Abigail
 Dorothy
 Elizabeth
 Osbert Mondeford of Methwold in Norfolk m. Mary, daughter of Garland of Brisingham in Norfolk, and had: 
 Mary, 1st daughter and coheiress, the wife of John Curlington of Norfolk
 Anne, the wife of William Peck of Wooddalling in Norfolk
 Adam ob. s.p.
 Richard ob. s.p.
 John, had: 
 Francis Mondeford of the Isle of Wight
 Geoffrey
 Edward
 Adam Mondeford

References 

1536 deaths
15th-century births
People from Feltwell